Christian Lombardo (born February 24, 1974) is an Argentinian former footballer who had stints in Argentina, and Canada.

Playing career 
In 1993, Lombardo began his career in the Primera D Metropolitana with Victoriano Arenas. In 1997, he played abroad in the USISL A-League with the Toronto Lynx. He made his debut on July 5, 1997, in a match against the Richmond Kickers, coming on as a substitute for Paul Stalteri. Throughout the season he appeared in five matches. He helped Toronto finish fourth in the Northeastern division, which resulted in a playoff berth. Their opponents in the first round of the postseason were the Montreal impact, where the Lynx lost the series by a score of 6–1 on goals of aggregate.

In 2001, he signed with the Toronto Supra of the Canadian Professional Soccer League. He recorded his first goal for the club on June 6, 2001, in a match against St. Catharines Wolves. Lombardo helped Toronto finish third in the overall standings, and secured a postseason berth. In the CPSL Championship final Supra faced St. Catharines Wolves, but lost to a score of 1–0. In 2004, he assisted Toronto Supra in securing their first divisional title the Eastern Conference title.

References 

Living people
Argentine footballers
Canadian Soccer League (1998–present) players
SC Toronto players
Soccer people from Ontario
Toronto Lynx players
A-League (1995–2004) players
1974 births
Association football defenders
Association football midfielders
Victoriano Arenas players
Primera D Metropolitana players
Sportspeople from Buenos Aires Province